Suzanne "Suzi" Oppenheimer (born December 13, 1934) is an American politician from New York, who served from 1985 to 2012 in the New York State Senate.

Early life and education
Oppenheimer was born on December 13, 1934, in New York City. She attended The Calhoun School in Manhattan. She graduated B.A. in economics from the Connecticut College for Women, and later earned a master's degree from Columbia University's Graduate School of Business. After receiving her degree, she worked on Wall Street as an industry analyst for L.F. Rothschild.

Career
She entered politics as a Democrat, and was President of the Mamaroneck League of Women Voters, and President of the PTA of the Central School in Mamaroneck. She served four terms as Mayor of the Village of Mamaroneck, as well as President of the Westchester Municipal Officials Association and President of the Westchester Municipal Planning Federation.

She was a member of the New York State Senate from 1985 to 2012, sitting in the 186th, 187th, 188th, 189th, 190th, 191st, 192nd, 193rd, 194th, 195th, 196th, 197th, 198th and 199th New York State Legislatures. Her district was numbered the 36th from January 1985 to 2002, and the 37th from 2003 to 2012. The district comprised a part of Westchester County.

She was a pivotal political supporter of the efforts of the Jay Coalition (today's non-profit Jay Heritage Center) to preserve the historic Jay Estate in Rye.

Having attended private schools herself (Calhoun School), she is a staunch supporter of the national and New York teachers unions, the American Federation of Teachers (AFT) and United Federation of Teachers (UFT), respectively, and an opponent of charter schools.

On Monday, December 6, 2010, Bob Cohen conceded to Oppenheimer after a lengthy ballot recount. She retired in 2012.

Awards and board memberships
In 2018, Oppenheimer received an award from the UJA-Federation of New York given to her for her leadership and dedicated to the community. She and her husband sit on UJA-Federation’s Commission on the Jewish People Task Force.

Personal life
She is married to Martin J. Oppenheimer, a partner in the law firm Proskauer Rose; the couple has four children and eight grandchildren.

References

External links

1934 births
Democratic Party New York (state) state senators
Jewish American state legislators in New York (state)
Jewish mayors of places in the United States
Connecticut College alumni
Columbia Business School alumni
Women state legislators in New York (state)
Living people
People from Mamaroneck, New York
21st-century American politicians
21st-century American women politicians
21st-century American Jews